"That Girl" is a song by American R&B singer and songwriter Stevie Wonder. It was the leading single from Wonder's album-era 1982 greatest-hits compilation, Stevie Wonder's Original Musiquarium I, as one of four newer songs from the collection. The song spent nine weeks at number one on the Billboard R&B singles chart – the longest time a Stevie Wonder single spent at the top spot – and reached number four on the Billboard Hot 100.

Charts

Weekly charts

Year-end charts

Influence
Jade - "Don't Walk Away"
Tupac Shakur - "So Many Tears"
Queen Latifah - "Let Her Live"

See also 
List of number-one R&B singles of 1982 (U.S.)
List of Cash Box Top 100 number-one singles of 1982

References

External links
 List of cover versions of "That Girl" at SecondHandSongs.com

1981 songs
1981 singles
Stevie Wonder songs
Songs written by Stevie Wonder
Tamla Records singles
Electropop songs
Cashbox number-one singles
Song recordings produced by Stevie Wonder